Oliver Bonas is a UK-based homeware and clothing store which opened its first store in Fulham Road, London.

History
Founded in 1993 by Oliver Tress, and as of 2019, there are 85 stores in the UK. Tress is the chief executive.

References

External links

British companies established in 1993
Retail companies based in London
Retail companies established in 1993
1993 establishments in England